Umar (: Age) is a 2006 Indian crime-drama film directed by Karan Razdan. The film stars Jimmy Sheirgill, Kader Khan, Satish Kaushik, Prem Chopra in lead roles, with Shenaz Treasurywala, Shakti Kapoor, Dalip Tahil and Rez Kempton in supporting roles. The film story follows a young man played by Shergill who has been framed for a crime he did not even commit and is on the run from the police, aided with three elder men played by Khan, Kaushik and Chopra.

Plot
Chandrakant Mehta (Prem Chopra), Rajpal Singh (Satish Kaushik) and Iqbal Khan (Kader Khan) are best friends, living their last years in United Kingdom. The lives of the men are complicated as Mehta and Singh are mistreated as servants by their own children and Khan is victim of racial discrimination from the British community. However, they find solace and love in form of a caring young man Shashank Dutt (Jimmy Sheirgill). Shashank is a student and works as a part-time waiter and singer in a bar for a living and is in love with Sapna Lakha (Shenaz Treasurywala), daughter of a rich business tycoon Prem Lakha (Shakti Kapoor). Sapna introduces Shashank to her father for marriage but the latter disagrees because of Shashank's status. However, the owner of the bar Victoria falls for Shashank and he rejects her advances, as he is still loyal to Sapna. But one day Victoria gets murdered and all the evidences points towards Shashank. Shashank is arrested and jailed by the police thereafter. After learning this incident, the three men help Shashank in his escape, which also turns them into fugitives as well.

Cast
 Jimmy Sheirgill as Shashank Dutt
 Shenaz Treasurywala as Sapna Lakha
 Kader Khan as Iqbal Khan
 Prem Chopra as Chandrakant Mehta
 Satish Kaushik as Rajpal Singh
 Shakti Kapoor as Prem Lakha
 Dalip Tahil as Ben Chibber (Banwari)
 Rez Kempton as Girish Mehta
 Varun Juneja as Chucky Singh

Critical reception
Film critic Taran Adarsh from Bollywood Hungama rated the film 1.5 out 5. Akash Gandhi rated the film 7.5 ou of 10, praising the performances and direction of the film.  Priyanka Jain from Rediff criticised the film with no ratings.

Music
All music composed by Shamir Tandon.

Trivia: Duniyawalon, a Qawwali, is the last released song Of the legendary singer Manna Dey

"Aankhon Mein Tum" - Hariharan, Sunidhi Chauhan
"Akele Mein Hum To Ghabhra Gaye'"- Babul Supriyo
"Bechein Sansein" - Bhupinder Singh
"Duniyawalon Ko Nahi Kuch Bhi" - Sonu Nigam, Manna Dey, Shabab Sabri, Kavita Krishnamurthy
"Kumari Chadke" - Jagjit Singh
"Piya" - Om (band)

References

External links
 

2000s Hindi-language films
Indian crime drama films
Films shot in London
2006 crime drama films
2006 films
Films about social issues in India
Films scored by Shamir Tandon
Films directed by Karan Razdan